Benson is a historic neighborhood in Omaha, Nebraska. Now a pocket within North Omaha, Benson Place was originally platted in 1887 and was annexed into the City of Omaha in 1917. Actor Nick Nolte lived in the Benson area before moving to the Westside district.

History
Erastus Benson was a land speculator, investor and philanthropist who unsuccessfully ran for Mayor of Omaha in 1906. He was an early investor in marketing Thomas Edison's inventions, including the phonograph and the Kinetoscope. On March 4, 1887, Benson platted the land on the Creighton farm and called it Benson Place, later changing it to Benson.

In the mid-to-late 1910s, Omaha embarked on a course of annexations of suburban communities to its north and west.  Residents of Benson, anticipating annexation of their own city, decided to build as many civic improvements as they could: they feared that Omaha would be inattentive to their desire for such improvements after annexation, and they knew that following annexation, the larger city would have to assume the debts incurred to build the improvements.  To this end, they built a new combined city hall and fire station in late 1915.

On May 25, 1917, the city of Omaha, Nebraska annexed the town of Benson.

Krug Park was an amusement park located at 2936 North 52nd Street in Benson. In 1930 the park was the site of the worst roller coaster accident in the country to that year, and in 1940 it was closed. Today Gallagher Park is located on the original Krug Park site.

Actor Nick Nolte lived in the Benson neighborhood on North 56th Street before his family moved to the Westside district.

Historic district

The Benson Commercial Historic District, centered along Maple St. between North 59th and North 63rd Sts., was listed on the U.S. National Register of Historic Places in 2020.

It includes numerous contributing buildings.

Benson has many historic buildings, including commercial, governmental, educational and residential structures. The following, many within the historic district, are some of them:

 Benson High School, 5120 Maple Street
 Masonic Temple, 5901 Maple Street, 1926-built, three-story Classical Revival building
 Commercial Building, 5913 Maple Street
 E.H. Olson Building, 5918 Maple Street
 Commercial Building, 6016 Maple Street
 Commercial Building, 6020 Maple Street
 Commercial Building, 6067 Maple Street
 John Sorenson Building, 6104 Maple Street
 Jas. A. Howard Building, 6105 Maple Street
 Bank of Benson, 6108 Maple Street
 Commercial Building, 6115 Maple Street
 Commercial Building, 6117 Maple Street
 B.H. Post Building, 6214 Maple Street
 Benson U.S. Post Office, 6223 Maple Street

References

Former municipalities in Nebraska
Landmarks in North Omaha, Nebraska
Neighborhoods in Omaha, Nebraska
History of North Omaha, Nebraska
Populated places established in 1887
1887 establishments in Nebraska